The Bernetz River is a  river in Quebec, Canada. It is a tributary of the Laflamme River, itself a tributary of the Bell River, which flows from the south into Lake Matagami. The river's catchment area is entirely forested and falls within the boundaries of the Eeyou Istchee (Baie-James) municipality in the administrative region of Nord-du-Quebec. The Bernetz River normally freezes over between December and April.

Rivers of Nord-du-Québec